FO Aquarii is an intermediate polar star system in the constellation Aquarius. The white dwarf and companion star orbit each other with a period of approximately 4.85 hours. The system is famous for a very strong optical pulsation which occurs every 20.9 minutes, corresponding with the rotational period of the accreting white dwarf. Prior to 2016, the system's long-term optical brightness varied between apparent magnitude 12.7 and 14.2, but in early 2016, it faded to magnitude 15.8 and thereafter began a slow recovery to its normal brightness, behavior which is indicative of a temporary dropoff in the mass-transfer rate between the two stars.

References

Intermediate polars
Aquarius (constellation)
Aquarii, FO